Raydio is an American funk and R&B vocal group formed in 1977 by Ray Parker Jr., with Vincent Bonham, Jerry Knight, and Arnell Carmichael.

Career

1970s and Raydio
After securing a record deal, the group scored their first big hit in early 1978 with "Jack and Jill", which was taken from their self-titled debut album. The song peaked at #8 on the U.S. Billboard Hot 100 chart, and reached #11 in the UK Singles Chart, earning a gold record in the process. "Is This a Love Thing" peaked at #27 in the UK in August 1978. Their next successful follow-up hit, "You Can't Change That" was released in 1979, and lifted from their Rock On album. The single reached #9 on the Billboard chart that year. In September 1979, they participated in an anti-nuclear concert at Madison Square Garden. Their performance of "You Can't Change That" at this show appears on the No Nukes album.

The 1980s and "Ray Parker Jr. and Raydio"
By late 1980, by which point Knight had left to pursue a solo career, the group had become known as Ray Parker Jr. and Raydio, and they released two more albums: Two Places at the Same Time (1980), and A Woman Needs Love (1981). These spawned another two top 40 single hits ("Two Places at the Same Time" - #30 in 1980; and "That Old Song" - #21 in 1981). Their last, and biggest hit, "A Woman Needs Love (Just Like You Do)," was also released in 1981, and peaked at #4 on the Billboard Hot 100.

After acknowledging the band had come to a crossroads and with Parker wanting to go solo, they quietly broke up in 1981.

Solo careers
Parker then started his solo career, scoring six top 40 hits in the 1980s, including "The Other Woman" (Pop #4), and "Ghostbusters". The latter song was the title track of the box office hit film Ghostbusters. The single stayed at #1 for three weeks on the Billboard Hot 100 in 1984.

Knight went on to have a moderately successful solo career of his own, later forming Ollie & Jerry, with Ollie E. Brown (who had been a session drummer on all of Raydio's albums) in the mid-1980s. Their two biggest hits also came from soundtracks: "Breakin'... There's No Stopping Us" was the theme to the motion picture Breakin', and reached #9 on the Hot 100 and #1 on the Hot Dance Club Play chart; their second single "Electric Boogaloo" (from the movie Breakin' 2: Electric Boogaloo), did not enter the Hot 100, but climbed to #43 on the dance chart.

In 2014, original members Arnell Carmichael and Vincent Bonham revived Raydio, recruiting two new members, James Carmichael formerly of the Arista group Q.T. Hush, and up-and-coming young singer Giovanni Rogers. They toured with Average White Band, War, Switch, DeBarge, among several other major tours.

Discography
All albums and singles listed below were issued on Arista Records. For Ray Parker Jr.'s solo releases. see Ray Parker Jr. discography.

Studio albums

Singles

References

External links

 Arnell Carmichael's MySpace page
 Ray Parker Jr 2012 Audio Interview at Soulinterviews.com

African-American musical groups
American rhythm and blues musical groups
Arista Records artists
Musical groups established in 1977
Musical groups disestablished in 1981
Musical groups from Detroit
Ray Parker Jr.